Ziarat (also Romanized as Zīārat, Zeyārat, and Zīyarat) is a village in Rudkhaneh Bar Rural District, Rudkhaneh District, Rudan County, Hormozgan Province, Iran. At the 2006 census, its population was 247 in 56 families.

References 

Populated places in Rudan County